Rödiger is a German surname. Notable people with the surname include:

 Alexander Rödiger (born 1985), German bobsledder
 Emil Rödiger (1801–1874), German orientalist

German-language surnames